Thomas-Marie-François Sauvage (1794 - May 1877) was a French dramatist, theatre director and critic.

He collaborated with Adolphe Adam (an opéra comique in two acts Le Toréador, 1849), Albert Grisar (Gilles ravisseur, 1838 ; L'Eau merveilleuse, 1839 ; Les Porcherons, 1850), François Bazin (Madelon, 1852), Napoléon Henri Reber (Le Père Gaillard, 1852) and Ambroise Thomas (Angélique et Médor, 1843 ; an opéra bouffon or opéra bouffe Le Caïd, 1849 ; La Tonelli, 1853 ; Le Carnaval de Venise, 1857 ; Gilles et Gillotin, 1874).

He was managing director of the Théâtre de l'Odéon from 1827 to 1828.

Bibliography 
Christian Goubault, « Thomas-Marie-François Sauvage » in Joël-Marie Fauquet (dir.), Dictionnaire de la musique en France au XIX siècle, Fayard, Paris, 2003

19th-century French dramatists and playwrights
French opera librettists
Writers from Paris
1794 births
1877 deaths